Vergo is a village and a former municipality in the Vlorë County, southern Albania. At the 2015 local government reform it became a subdivision of the municipality Delvinë. The population at the 2011 census was 1,844. The municipal unit consists of the villages Vergo, Tatzat, Kalasë, Fushë Vërri, Kopaçez, Qafë Dardhë (previously: Palavli) and Bajkaj inhabited by Muslim Albanians and Senicë populated by an Orthodox Albanian population, making up 94% and 6% of the total each.

A Greek school was founded in Vergo by Orthodox missionary, Kosmas the Aetolian, at 1779.

References

Former municipalities in Vlorë County
Administrative units of Delvinë
Villages in Vlorë County